Perry Barr Greyhound Stadium may refer to:

 Birchfield Ladbroke Stadium
 Perry Barr Stadium